The history of Freemasonry in Mexico can be traced to at least 1806 when the first Masonic lodge was formally established in the nation.

Many presidents of Mexico were Freemasons. Freemasonry greatly influenced political actions in the early republic, as holders of conservative ideas gathered in lodges of the Scottish Rite, while reformists choose the York Rite. Hence escoceses  became synonymous with Conservatives, and yorkinos with Liberals. Santa Anna was a Scottish Rite Mason.

History
Freemasonry arrived in colonial Mexico during the second half of the 18th century, brought by French immigrants who settled in the capital. However, they were condemned by the local Inquisition and forced to desist. It is probable, though no written evidence exists, that there were itinerant lodges in the Spanish army in New Spain. Freemasons may even have been able to participate in the first autonomist movements, then for independence, conveying the ideas of enlightenment in the late 18th century. Some historians, both Freemasons and non-Freemasons,  including Leon Zeldis Mendel and José Antonio Ferrer Benimeli have emphasized that Freemasonry in Latin America had built its own mythology, well away from what history records. The distinction between Patriotic Latin American Societies and Masonic lodges is tenuous. Between the late 18th and early 19th century, their operative structure was very similar, as is indicated by the historian Virginia Guedea.

The first Masonic Lodge of Mexico, Arquitectura Moral, was founded in 1806. The year 1813 saw the creation of the first Grand Lodge of Mexico, Scottish Rite.

Jose Maria Mateos, a leading Liberal politician of the late 19th century, stated in 1884 that some illustrious autonomists and independentists, such as Miguel Hidalgo, Jose Maria Morelos y Pavon and Ignacio Allende, were Freemasons. According to Mateos, they were, for the most part, initiated in the lodge Arquitectura Moral (now Bolivar No. 73), but it is true that there are no documents to prove his point. However, there are documents that seem to prove that the first Governor of independent Mexico the emperor Agustín de Iturbide, and the Dominican friar Servando Teresa de Mier, were both Freemasons. But it is true that it was common for the Inquisition to use the charge of belonging to Freemasonry in order to attack autonomists and independentists, which guarantees the impossibility of proving the innocence of the accused, due to the clandestine nature of the Orders. Thus, the archives of the Inquisition don't eliminate the uncertainties on this subject.

From the independence in 1821 until 1982, it is believed that many of the leaders of Mexico belonged to Freemasonry. When political independence came about, the few existing lodges came out of hiding and multiplied. With the arrival of the Minister Plenipotentiary of the United States Joel Roberts Poinsett, the young Mexican Freemasonry was divided into two political movements, without really being defined. Poinsett promotes the creation of the Lodge of York Rite, close to the interests of the United States. Meanwhile, conservative Freemasons of the Scottish Lodge of the young Ancient and Accepted Scottish Rite, headed by the last viceroy doctor from Barcelona, Manuel Codorniu, manifested their opposition to the realization of the interventionist theory Manifest Destiny in the newspaper "El Sol". Thus, Freemasons who support American-style liberalism met around the lodges of the York Rite, while Freemasons who would be seen as "conservatives" remained close to the Scottish lodges, although they considered themselves heirs of Spanish liberalism. Soon, those Freemasons who did not identify with the existing alternatives would choose a third way in founding in 1825 a national rite called the National Mexican Rite, which would aim to create a political model for, and a clean government in, Mexico.

During the French military occupation that placed Maximilian I of Mexico on the throne in 1864, various French military lodges, dependent on the Grand Orient de France, arrived in Mexico, but disappeared when the French left the country. Thus, it is very likely that these Itinerant Lodges of the French Rite, due to their status as being perceived as invaders, left no influences of ritual. At the museum of Masonic Grand Orient of France, one banner of one of those lodges is preserved.

During the nineteenth century Freemasonry was being heralded as a means of removing the influences of the Catholic Church. Several of the men who were masons had expressed a desire to free women from the church's grasp through education, and they approached Laureana Wright de Kleinhans to help spread freemasonry. Though she was totally committed to the education of women, she ultimately rejected the organization because they refused to acknowledge the equality of men and women and in fact had an initiation oath which declared "never admit to their ranks a blind man, a madman, or a woman".

According to historian Karen Racine, Freemasons in the presidency of Mexico included: Guadalupe Victoria, Valentín Gómez Farías, Antonio López de Santa Anna, Benito Juárez, Sebastián Lerdo de Tejada, Porfirio Díaz, Francisco I. Madero, Venustiano Carranza, Plutarco Elías Calles, Lázaro Cárdenas, Emilio Portes Gil, Pascual Ortiz Rubio, Abelardo L. Rodríguez, and Miguel Alemán Valdés.

Major Rites

National Mexican Rite

Ancient and Accepted Scottish Rite

The Scottish Rite bodies in Mexico are:

Supreme Council of México, 33rd Degree for the Masonic Jurisdiction of the united states of México. 
The Sovereign Grand Commander:

IPH Alfonso Sierra Chacon

Supreme Council of México, 33rd Degree for the Masonic Jurisdiction of the North, South and Center of the United States of México. 
The Sovereign Grand Commander:

IPH Jorge Alejandro Aviles Reyes

York Rite
The York Rite bodies in Mexico are integrated into two bodies that practice Royal Arch Masonry as recognized internationally:

The Grand Chapter of Royal Arch Masons Unified of Mexico (Gran Capítulo de Masones del Real Arco Unificado de México)
The Grand Chapter of Royal Arch Masons of the United States of Mexico (Gran Capítulo de Masones del Real Arco de los Estados Unidos Mexicanos)

The next degree-conferring bodies are:

The Grand Council of Cryptic Masons Of México
The Grand Commandery of Knights Templar of México

The York Rite bodies have a horizontal structure, as opposed to the vertical Scottish Rite where the philosophical degrees commence with the 4th to the 33rd degree. However, entrance has always been through the Royal Arch degrees, which enable all Master Masons who have taken the Royal Arch degrees to continue their path in search of further light in Masonry with the Cryptic and Commandery degrees. These last two degrees can be chosen separately and in no particular order.

In Mexico the Regular York Rite bodies with international recognition are the Royal Arch Chapters, the Councils of Cryptic Masons and The Grand Commanderies of the Knights Templar.

As a result, the General Grand Chapter Royal Arch Masons International only supports and acknowledges two Royal Arch Grand Chapters in Mexico:

*The Grand Chapter of Royal Arch Unified of Mexico
(Gran Capítulo de Masones del Real Arco Unificado de México)

Located in CDMX, and presided (2020–2022) by:

M.E.C. José de Jesus Andrade Hidalgo as Grand High Priest;

M.E.C. Martín Juárez Ibarra as Grand King;

M.E.C. José Julian Cholula Muñoz as Grand Scribe;

M.E.C. Daniel Vázquez Dosal as Grand Secretary;

M.E.C. Amado Ovidio Gil Villarello as Grand Treasurer.

The Grand Chapter of Royal Arch Masons Unified of Mexico have next constituent chapters:

Michoacán (Mich) No. 1

Estado de Mèxico (EDO MEX) No. 3

Quintana Roo No. 4

Nayarit (NAY) No. 5

Sinaloa Culiacán (SIN) No. 6

Tijuana (BC) No. 7

Mexicali (BC) No. 8

Caballeros del Real Arco (CDMX) No. 9

Tetelictic (Pue) No. 10

Kodesh L'Adonai (Querétaro) No. 11

Green Dragon (CDMX) No. 12

Gihon (CDMX) No. 13

San Luis Potosí (SLP) No. 17

Génesis 1:28 (SLP) No. 18

Constructores del Tabernáculo (NL) No. 19

Novus Ordo (CH) No. 20

Paso del Norte (CH) No. 21

Coahuila (Coahuila) No. 22

Annubis (BC) No. 25

*The Grand Chapter of Royal Arch Masons of the United States of Mexico
(Gran Capítulo de Masones del Real Arco de los Estados Unidos Mexicanos)

Located in the city of Guadalajara, state of Jalisco, and presided (2014–16) by:

M.E.C. Juan Ramón Negrete Marín as Grand High Priest;

M.E.C. Christian Martinez Sandoval as Grand King;

M.E.C. Mario Tanús Herrera as Grand Scribe;

M.E.C. Joaquín Vega Antúnez as Grand Secretary;

M.E.C. Ricardo Preciado Ploneda as Grand Treasurer.

Both Grand Chapters have Ambassadors as appointed by the General Grand Chapter:

Grand Chapter of Mexico - Ambassador - Manuel del Castillo Trulín- Deputy Ambassador - Jaime Pérez-Velez Olvera PGHP.
Grand Chapter of the USM - Ambassador - Ricardo Ruíz Guillén

*The Grand Council of Cryptic Masons of México
Located in the city of Guadalajara, state of Jalisco

*The Grand Commandery of Knights Templar of México
Located in Teteles, state of Puebla, and Presided (2019–2021) by:

SK Omar Ali Gúzman Castillo as Eminent Grand Commander;

SK José Jaime Lovera Centeno Deputy Grand Commander;

SK Luis Eduardo Luna Arredondo as Grand Generalissimo;

SK Carlos Manuel Rudametkin Barajas as Grand Captain General;

SK Javier García Cardoso as Grand Recorder;

SK Ruben Jeronimo Escobedo as Grand Treasurer;

SK Augusto Rodrigo Cervantes Gutiérrez as Past Grand Commander (2017-2019);

SK Marco Enrique Rosales Gutierrez as Past Grand Commander (2011-2017);

SK Jaime Rios Otero as Past Grand Commander (2008-2011).

The Grand Commandery of Mexico has 21 constituent Commanderies:

Al Aqsa No. 1
Caballeros de Magdala No. 2
Provincia de la Vera Cruz No. 3
Aridoamericana No. 4
Hugues de Paynes No. 5
J.B de Molay No. 6
Orden de la Veracruz No. 7
Fabian Guzmán Castillo No. 8
Guardianes del Santo Sepulcro No. 9
Rosslyn No. 10
Simonem Cyreneum No. 11
Santo Grial No. 12
Monte Moriat No. 13
Ora et Labora No. 14
Raza Purepecha No. 15
José Magallanes Caldera No. 16
Estado de México No. 17
San Bernardo UD
Capital City UD
Caballeros de Payns UD
Coxala UD
Grand Encampment of Knights Templar, U.S.A - Ambassador - SK Luis Eduardo Luna Arredondo

There are additional honorary or invitational degrees available as well as para-masonic national organizations.

- Pelotón de la Muerte

Mexican Masonic Organisation

Confederations

Confederation of Regular Grand Lodges of the United Mexican States
The Confederation of Regular Grand Lodges of the Mexican United States, Spanish: Confederación de las Grandes Regulares Logia de los Estados Unidos Mexicanos, brings together the Regular Grand Lodges in Mexico since 1932. It is headed by the Masonic National Council, Spanish: Consejo Nacional Masónico, consisting of grand masters of the grand lodges members of the confederation.  Each of the Grand Lodges is recognized by some of the State Grand Lodges in the United States, but no US State Grand Lodge recognizes all of them.
The confederation includes the Grand Lodges of 30 states of the 31 states that constitute the United Mexican States:
 Aguascalientes, "Profesor Edmundo Games Orozco"
 Baja California,
 Baja California Sur,
 Campeche,
 Chiapas,
 Chihuahua, "Cosmos",
 Coahuila, "Benito Juárez",
 Colima, "Sur Oueste",
 Durango, "Guadalupe Victoria"
 Guanajuato,
 Guerrero,
 Hidalgo,
 Jalisco, "Occidental Mexicana",
 Estado de Mexico,
 Michoacán, "Lázaro Cárdenas",
 Morelos,
 Nayarit,
 Nuevo León,
 Oaxaca, "Benito Juárez García",
 Puebla, "Benemérito Ejército de Oriente",
 Querétaro,
 Quitana Roo, "Andrés Quintana Roo",
 San Luis Potosí, "Soberana e Independiente del Potosí",
 Sinaloa del REAyA
 Sonora, "Pacífico",
 Tabasco, "Restauración",
 Tamaulipas,
 Veracruz, "Unidad Mexicana",
 Yucatán, "La Oriental Peninsular,
 Zacatecas, "Jesús González Ortega".

Federal Grand Lodges

York Grand Lodge of Mexico
This Grand Lodge claims jurisdiction over all of Mexico and has thirty-six lodges in different parts of the country.  It is the only Grand Jurisdiction in Mexico to be recognized by the United Grand Lodge of England and all the US State Grand Lodges.

Grand Lodge Valle de Mexico
The Grand Lodge Valle de Mexico consists of 260 lodges. Its lodges work in the Ancient and Accepted Scottish Rite. This Grand Lodge no longer operates as a regular Grand Lodge. Since the 1990s, it has been accused of invading the territorial jurisdiction of a number of state Grand Lodges in Mexico, as well as the territorial jurisdiction of Grand Lodges in the United States of America. Also, the Grand Lodge Valle de Mexico is guilty of permitting the discussion of partisan politics in its lodges. The political parties in Mexico have been covering the resolutions and the elections of Grand Masters since 2001. As a result of these problems, the member Grand Lodges of the Confederation of Regular Mexican Grand Lodges and the Grand Lodge Valle de Mexico have terminated Masonic relations with each other.

State Grand Lodges
 Grand Lodge of Baja California
 Grand Lodge of Baja California Sur
 Grand Lodge of Campeche
 Grand Lodge of Chiapas
 Chihuahua: Grand Lodge Cosmos
 Coahuila: Grand Lodge 'Benito Juarez' (Note: As the result of a schism in 1977, there are now two grand lodges in Coahuila using the same name, "Gran Logia 'Benito Juarez' del Estado de Coahuila." The original grand lodge, which is regular, operates out of offices located at Bahia de Ballenas #933; Colonia Nueva California; Torreon, Coahuila C.P. 27089. It is a member of the Confederation of Regular Grand Lodges of the Mexican United States.) 
 Colima: Grand Lodge Sur-Oeste
 City of Mexico: Grand Lodge of the City of Mexico (G.L.C.M.). Regular jurisdiction established in 2010, under the standards of Recognition: Legitimacy of Origin, Exclusive Territorial Jurisdiction, except by mutual consent and/or treaty, and     Adherence to the Ancient Landmarks (Belief in God, the Volume of Sacred Law, and the prohibition of the discussion of politics and religion).

 Durango: Grand Lodge Guadalupe Victoria. The Grand Lodge "Guadalupe Victoria" (the first president of Mexico) of Durango State is a federation of Masonic lodges of the State of Durango in Mexico. It was created in 1923, but before that date, the lodges of the state depended on the Grand Lodge of the State of Coahuila. His lodges practice exclusively the Ancient and Accepted Scottish Rite. The Grand Lodge is located in the capital of the State, Durango. It is a founding member of the Confederation of Regular Grand Lodges of the United States of Mexico. As such, it has an important role in the Mexican Freemasonry. Each year it participates to the seminars of Grand Lodges of Mexico to synthesize the work on the society facts done in its lodges. The symposium ends with sending the summary of its analysis to the Government of the Mexican Republic.
 Grand Lodge of Hidalgo
 Jalisco: Grand Lodge Occidental Mexicana
 Michoacana: Grand Lodge Lazaro Cardenas
 Grand Lodge of Nayarit
 Grand Lodge of Nuevo León
 Oaxaca: Grand Lodge Benito Juarez Garcia
 Grand Lodge of Querétaro
 Grand Lodge of Quintana Roo
 San Luis Potosí: Grand Lodge El Potosi
 Grand Lodge of Sinaloa REAyA
 Sonora: Grand Lodge Del Pacífico
 Tabasco: Grand Lodge Restauración
 Grand Lodge of Tamaulipas
 Veracruz: Grand Lodge Unida Mexicana
 Yucatán: Grand Lodge Oriental Peninsular

Le Droit Humain
The International Order of Freemasonry Le Droit Humain is a global Masonic Order, it is also present in Mexico through its Mexican Jurisdiction which has 6 lodges].

Notes

Further reading
 Bastian, Jean-Pierre. "Protestants, Freemasons, and Spiritists: Non-Catholic Religious Socabilities and Mexico’s Revolutionary Movement, 1910–1920" in Matthew Butler, ed., Faith and Impiety in Revolutionary Mexico (London: Palgrave, 2007), pp. 75–92.
 Camp, Roderic A. Mexico's Leaders, Their Education & Recruitment (University of Arizona Press, 1980)
 Davis, Thomas Brabson. Aspects of Freemasonry in modern Mexico: an example of social cleavage (Vantage Press, 1976)
 Gould, Robert Freke. Freemasonry in Mexico (Kessinger Publishing, 2003)
 Racine, Karen. "Freemasonry" in Encyclopedia of Mexico. Chicago: Fitzroy Dearborn 1997, pp. 538–540.
 Rich, Paul. "Problems in the Historiography of Mexican Freemasonry, Part I"
 Smith, Benjamin. "Anticlericalism, politics, and freemasonry in Mexico, 1920–1940." The Americas 65.4 (2009): 559-588. online
 Weisberger, Richard William, Wallace McLeod, and S. Brent Morris, eds. Freemasonry on both sides of the Atlantic: essays concerning the craft in the British Isles, Europe, the United States, and Mexico (East European Monographs, 2002)

In Spanish
Cobos Alfaro, Felipe Amalio, "La masonería en la Revolución de Independencia" in 1810, 1910: Reflexiones sobre dos procesos históricos. Memoria, Cristina Gómez Álvarez, Josefina Mac Gregor Gárate, Mariana Ozuna Castañeda (coordinators) México, Universidad Nacional Autónoma de México, Facultad de Filosofía y Letras, 2010, pp. 63–91 Felipe A. Cobos Alfaro "La masonería en la Revolución de Independencia"
 Martínez Zaldúa, Ramón. "Historia de la Masonería en la legislación reformista de la primera generación de liberales en México." In Masonería española y América. vol. 1. Zaragoza: Centro de Estudios Históricos de la Masonería Española, 1993.
Zalce y Rodríguez, Luis J. Apuntes para la historia de la Masonería en México. 18th edition. Mexico City: Banca y Comercio 1983.

External links
The International Order of Freemasonry for Men and Women — Mexican Federation
The International Order of Freemasonry for Men and Women, LE DROIT HUMAIN
Grand Lodge of the Valley of Mexico
Grand Lodge of Baja California State
Grand Lodge Guadalupe Victoria of Durango State
The General Grand Chapter Royal Arch Masons International